is a Japanese artistic gymnast. Born in Osaka, Japan, he started gymnastics at the age of 2. Matsumi graduated from Sendai University & later joined Tokushukai Gymnastics Club.

Competitive history

Detailed Results

2017-2020 Code of Points

See also 
 Japan men's national gymnastics team

References

External links 
 Kazuki Matsumi

Japanese male artistic gymnasts
Sportspeople from Osaka Prefecture
Living people
1997 births
20th-century Japanese people
21st-century Japanese people